Adrian Charles Newland CBE FRCP, FRCPath (born  26 August 1949) is a British haematologist, former President of the Royal College of Pathologists and consultant at the Barts and The London NHS Trust.

References 

 http://www.nice.org.uk/get-involved/meetings-in-public/diagnostics-advisory-committee/members
 ‘NEWLAND, Prof. Adrian Charles’, Who's Who 2012, A & C Black, 2012; online edn., Oxford University Press, Dec 2011 ; online edn, Nov 2011, accessed 22 Feb 2012
 https://web.archive.org/web/20141018100803/http://www.bmihealthcare.co.uk/consultant/consultantdetails?p_name=Adrian-Newland&p_id=40341

1949 births
Commanders of the Order of the British Empire
Fellows of the Royal College of Physicians
Fellows of the Royal College of Pathologists
Living people